Luoji Township may refer to several places in China:

 Luoji Township, Lu'an (罗集乡), in Yu'an District, Lu'an, Anhui
 Luoji Township, Xiayi County (骆集乡), in Xiayi County, Henan
 Luoji Township, Shangri-La County (洛吉乡), in Yunnan

Township name disambiguation pages